Geoffrey Gratwick (born July 16, 1943) is an American politician and physician from Maine. Gratwick is a Democratic State Senator from Maine's 9th District, representing part of Penobscot County, including the City of Bangor and the neighboring town of Hermon. Prior to being elected to the Maine Senate, Gratwick served 9 years on the Bangor City Council.

Biography
Geoff was born into a family of educators. His father was a high school principal, his mother a school librarian and all of his four brothers and sisters at one time or another have been teachers. He followed a different track and went to Harvard College, Cambridge University in England, Columbia College of Physicians and Surgeons, and then New York Hospital/Cornell University for postgraduate medical training in rheumatology. He practiced medicine in Bangor 1979-2015 and ran arthritis clinics from Waterville to Machias to Presque Isle and other places in between.

Geoff and his wife Lucy, a clinical psychologist and president of the Bangor Land Trust, have lived in Bangor since 1978. They have two adopted children and six grandchildren. Plus a number of chickens, sheep, geese, goats and other animals have joined them at one time or another on their small farm in Bangor. Geoff has continued to be active in athletics; he won national and European rowing championships while in college and a recent gold medal at the European championships (2016). He has been a board member of the Maine Humanities council and is a longtime member of the Bangor Rotary Club.

Legislative Accomplishments
In 2012, Geoff won a hotly contested race and beat an incumbent Republican to become State Senator. In the Legislature he has served on the Insurance and Financial Services Committee (chair: 2012- 2014), the Environmental and the Natural Resources Committee, and Government Oversight Committee. In 2017, he was appointed to the Opioid Task Force. In late 2017, he was the driving force behind the formation of the Health Care Task Force which has been charged with determining how to make health care in Maine universal, affordable, accessible and of high quality.

References

Living people
Democratic Party Maine state senators
Harvard College alumni
Alumni of the University of Cambridge
Cornell University alumni
Columbia University Vagelos College of Physicians and Surgeons alumni
Physicians from Maine
Bangor City Council members
21st-century American politicians
People from White Plains, New York
1943 births